Saint-Henri is a neighbourhood in southwestern Montreal, Quebec, Canada, in the borough of Le Sud-Ouest.

Saint-Henri is usually considered to be bounded to the east by Atwater Avenue, to the west by the town of Montreal West, to the north by Autoroute Ville-Marie (Route 136), and to the south by the Lachine Canal.

Description 
Saint-Henri is well known as a historically French-Canadian, Irish and black working class neighbourhood. Often contrasted with wealthy Westmount or NDG looking down over the Falaise Saint-Jacques, in recent years it has been strongly affected by gentrification.

The area—historically known as Les Tanneries because of the artisans' shops where leather tanning took place—was named for St. Henry via the Église Saint-Henri, which at one time formed Place Saint-Henri along with the community's fire and police station. The bustle of a nearby passenger rail station was immortalized in the song "Place St. Henri" (1964) by Oscar Peterson.

Saint-Henri is part of the municipal district of Saint-Henri–Petite-Bourgogne–Pointe-Saint-Charles. The borough hall for Le Sud-Ouest is located in a converted factory in Saint-Henri, bearing witness to the borough's industrial heritage.

Also located in the neighbourhood is Solin Hall, a student residence of McGill University. The former chocolate factory is home to nearly 300 students, and is the University's only off-campus residence.

There are two metro stations in Saint-Henri; Lionel-Groulx and Place-Saint-Henri.

History 

Église Saint-Henri was so named to commemorate Fr. Henri-Auguste Roux (1798–1831), the superior of Saint-Sulpice Seminary. The municipality of Saint-Henri was formed in 1875, joining the village of Saint-Henri and the surrounding settlements of Turcot, Brodie, Saint-Agustin and Sainte-Marguerite into one administrative unit. The municipality was incorporated into the City of Montreal in 1905.

Well-known people from Saint-Henri include strongman Louis Cyr, who served as a police officer there; the Place des Hommes-Forts and the Parc Louis-Cyr are named for him. Celebrated jazz pianist Oscar Peterson grew up in Little Burgundy which is the neighborhood adjacent to Saint-Henri. Stand-up comedian Yvon Deschamps has described the daily struggle of Saint-Henri's citizens with humorous melancholy.

Saint-Henri and Little Burgundy are considered to have a fairly common social makeup. Historically, Saint-Henri was occupied predominantly by French-Canadian blue-collar workers while Little Burgundy was occupied primarily by African-Canadians who worked on the railroads. Today both neighbourhoods have a population of varied ethnicity and social class, especially in the recent housing developments that have sprouted along the Lachine Canal. A great number of teenagers from neighboring districts attend Polyvalente Saint-Henri and James Lyng High School (English Montreal School Board).

St-Henri housed the Victor Talking Machine Company's first factory space located in Canada where they produced flat discs, gramophones, radios, and military equipment for the Second World War.  Though the space has changed much over the years and the building is no longer in use as a factory of RCA Victor, there is a museum located in the old RCA building called le Musée des Ondes Emile Berliner. The museum covers the life of Emile Berliner, inventor of the gramophone, as well as details the history of his inventions, as well as his company even after his family was no longer affiliated with it. The museum is a technology museum and explores the nature and science behind sound waves. 

Many of the district's notable Art deco buildings, including Atwater Market and the historic No. 23 fire hall, were designed by Ludger Lemieux.

The neighbourhood is served by the Lionel-Groulx and Place-Saint-Henri Metro stations.

Gentrification

Introduction 
St-Henri is located in Le Sud-Ouest Borough, and became a part of the City of Montreal in 1905. Its proximity to the Lachine Canal shaped the neighborhood with a large industrial working class. Industry lasted from the canal's opening in 1825, until its closure in 1970. Its closure meant the predominantly working-class neighborhood began to lose their jobs, creating thousands of unemployed laborers. This deindustrialization rendered the neighborhood the site for gentrification. Sitting on valuable land bordered by the Lachine Canal and both the downtown and Old Montreal, St Henri is primed for redevelopment of old industrial buildings into parks, mixed use developments, condos, shops and restaurants. This transformation began taking form when the Canal was reopened in 2002 with the presence of pedestrian and cyclist paths, bringing more residents and tourists to the area. St Henri is seen as a victim of gentrification, characterized by the arrival of younger wealthy residents and the revitalization of the neighborhood with parks and commercial spaces. Once described as a working-class neighborhood with factories, its contemporary form is a “lively and surprising borough” ranked as Montreal's second best neighborhood for its livability and atmosphere.

Evidence of gentrification in St. Henri 
Changes to the demographic composition of a neighbourhood are an indicator of gentrification. Particularly, increased proportions of college educated residents and residents aged 25 to 34 years old have been found to signal gentrification. This cohort's role in gentrification has been in part attributed to amenities in downtown areas which draw this "creative class" to neighbourhoods perceived as undervalued.

In St. Henri, between 2001 and 2011, the proportion of residents aged 25–34 rose by seven percentage points : from 20.1% to 27.1%. By comparison, Montreal's share of residents aged 25–34 only increased from 16.3%  to 17.0%. This overrepresentation of the 25-34-year-old age group reflects the gentrification of St. Henri. The progression of neighbourhood residents that are college graduates is less indicative of gentrification than the previous measure. However, during this period, the St. Henri neighbourhood goes from being below the city's average to above it with its share of residents having graduated from college increasing from 25.9% in 2001 (26.4% in Montreal) to 43.1% in 2011 (41.5% in Montreal).

Gentrification is most often associated with an increase in average neighbourhood income . Contrasting the average household income of St. Henri residents with that of Montreal residents shows that the neighbourhood's revenues has comparatively increased. In 2001 the average household income in St.Henri was 29% lower than in Montreal. In 2011, the average income in the neighbourhood decreased to about 17% lower than that of Montreal.

The changes in availability of services is also telling of gentrification. From 1996 to 2011 rue Notre-Dame, a street which runs through the whole neighbourhood, has seen a considerable increase in the number of entrepreneurial services such as coffee shops and boutiques accompanied by a smaller increase in the number of corporate chains. Conversely street-level vacant lots on this rue Notre-Dame decreased from 26.2% to 13.5%.

Everyday Politics and Resistance in St. Henri 
In St. Henri, up-scale condominiums, boutique shops and other signs of gentrification have displaced, marginalized and stressed those of lower socio-economic status (SES). In response to gentrifying practices, inhabitants within the historically low-income neighborhood have taken up various forms of everyday politics. The power on display in St. Henri can be understood as the increasingly prevalent neo-liberal order, resulting in a free market focus for urban planning initiatives (Rose, 2017). In St. Henri, everyday politics is a mode of resistance to the aforementioned powers by opposing oppressive and unjust treatment from powerful actors and broad social forces. How subordinate inhabitants of St. Henri engage in this resistance can vary from informal behavior to formally organized and confrontational acts, the former being everyday resistance. Through the gentrification of St. Henri, everyday resistance must precede overt forms of resistance, suggesting that the neighborhood has harbored this resistance, leading to more consistent resistance. Gentrification as a physical and social force, allows for everyday resistance to manifest into organized resistance, garnering the attention of media outlets.

In 2016, a boutique grocery store known as ‘3734’ was vandalized by masked individuals, displaying anti-capitalist rhetoric and displeasure for the arrival of condos in St. Henri. During a Halloween demonstration, the ‘Collective for an Autonomous Space’ rallied and marched for housing rights and alternatives to commercializing vacant properties. With a surge of expensive condos being built in recent years replacing low-income options, dozens marched on Tenant's Day in 2016 organized by a coalition of actors, ending in front of the Quebec Minister of Economic Development office. These organized forms of resistance, ranging from violent to peaceful, proceed with gentrification in St. Henri. In St. Henri, as gentrification proliferates, the inhabitants of the neighborhood look toward more organized and targeted political activism to resist the powers of neo-liberal urban planning agendas. Resistance in St.Henri can be seen as collective action and people-led solutions to neighborhood challenges. These solutions call upon formal authorities, resulting in programs affordable housing development initiatives and requirements by the Quebec government.

Indirect displacements by gentrification 
Concerning Twigge-Molecey and the St Henri neighbourhood, inhabitants form social ties to others within their same neighbourhood. However, this is particularly true amongst low-income groups, as these people often do not have the opportunity to build a social network outside their living area. In a situation where their houses are repossessed, such people struggle to find new houses within the same neighbourhood and fail to remain socially integrated. As a result, they are forced to live elsewhere, where there is distance between them and their social circle in the previous neighbourhood. This particular scenario embodies a form of social displacement.

Moreover, the notion of “sense of place” is threatened by newcomers whose presence would change the character and cultural shape of the place. Regarding gentrification in St Henri, conflicts emerged between lifelong low-income residents and incoming condominium dwellers, the latter denying their belonging to St Henri neighbourhood. Newcomers also display forms of condescension and snobbery that create social separation between inhabitants of the same neighbourhood. Those behaviors underline the shifting of senses of place and highlight a cultural displacement. This type of displacement results “when the tastes, norms and desires of newcomers supplant and replace those of incumbent residents”.

Finally, the cultural displacement is another indirect consequence caused by gentrification. In 2006 a new IGA supermarket opened in St Henri. As prices are higher to familial small-scale grocery stores located in St Henri, the buying-power of low-income residents has been reduced. Thus, low-income renters feel rejected from the neighbourhood. This feeling is also seen in the new renovated Louis Cyr park in St Henri. Since it has been rebuilt, it became attractive for dog-sitters who could now leave their dogs off leashes. As a result, it discouraged parents from letting their children play in those areas by fear of the aggressive dogs. Overall, it appears that low-income residents suffer more from changes associated with gentrification through socioeconomic and cultural displacements.

Depictions in literature and film

The district's working-class character was most memorably recorded by Gabrielle Roy in her novel The Tin Flute (Bonheur d'occasion).

Saint-Henri has been the subject of two National Film Board of Canada (NFB) documentaries, each capturing one day in the life of the district. In 1962 Hubert Aquin directed À St-Henri le cinq septembre (September Five at Saint-Henri). In 2010, director Shannon Walsh and producer Sarah Spring oversaw a crew of sixteen videographers as they followed area residents during one summer's day to make À St-Henri le 26 août, an NFB/Parabola Films co-production inspired by Aquin's cinéma-vérité classic.

Notable people from Saint-Henri
 Oscar Peterson - Canadian jazz pianist 
 Pat Burns - former police officer, NHL head coach and TV hockey broadcaster
Yvon Deschamps - author, actor, comedian and producer
 Louis Cyr - strongman who served as a police officer in Saint-Henri, commemorated with a park, a square, and a statue

See also
 Little Burgundy
 Pointe-Saint-Charles
 Saint-Henri Church

Gallery

References

External links

 Documentary film about the neighbourhood released in 2011, "St-Henri, the 26th of August"
 Parish oral history of part of Saint-Henri with a number of historical photographs.
 
 Saint-Henri Historical Society website.
 https://moeb.ca/en/about-the-museum/ 

Saint-Henri
Le Sud-Ouest
Irish-Canadian culture in Montreal
Gentrification in Canada
Hipster neighborhoods